The Primera División, known officially as Liga Profesional de Fútbol, or Torneo Binance for sponsorship reasons, is a professional football league in Argentina, organised by the Argentine Football Association (AFA).

The Primera División is the country's premier football division and is the top division of the Argentine football league system. It operates on a system of promotion and relegation with the Primera Nacional (Second Division), with the teams placed lowest at the end of the season being relegated. Since 2020, relegation has been suspended due to COVID-19 pandemic.

With the first championship held in 1891, Argentina became the first country outside the United Kingdom (where the Football League had debuted in 1888, and the Scottish and Irish Football Leagues in 1890) to establish a football league. In the early years, only teams from Buenos Aires, Greater Buenos Aires, La Plata and Rosario were affiliated to the national association. Teams from other cities would join in later years.

The Primera División turned professional in 1931 when 18 clubs broke away from the amateur leagues to form a professional one. Since then, the season has been contested annually in four different formats and calendars.

The Argentine championship was ranked in the top 10 as one of the strongest leagues in the world (for 1 January 2015 – 31 December 2015 period) by the International Federation of Football History & Statistics (IFFHS). Argentina placed 4th after La Liga (Spain), Serie A (Italy), and Bundesliga (Germany).

Format and teams

Championship 

The 2023 season will be contested by 28 teams, including the 26 teams from the previous season (so there were no relegations during in 2021) plus the two teams promoted from 2022 Primera Nacional. The league season began on 27 January and will end on 5 August 2023.

Participating teams played each other in a round-robin system totaling 27 rounds. The team with most points at the end of the season crowned champion.

Relegation 
Relegation is based on an averaging system. At the end of the season, the two teams with the worst three-year averages are relegated, while the winner and runner-up of Primera Nacional championship are promoted to Primera.

Domestic cups

The Primera División champion gains a place to play the Trofeo de Campeones de la Liga Profesional v. the winner of Copa de la Liga Profesional.

The 4th. edition of Copa de la Liga Profesional will be held in the second semester of 2023, when the league tournament concludes. It will begin on 20 August and will end on 16 December. Teams will be divided into two zones (A and B) and will play each other in a single round robin format, totalising 14 fixtures.

International cups

As of 2022, five clubs from Argentina are eligible to play the Copa Libertadores. The champion of Primera División automatically qualifies for the tournament. The other four teams best placed in the table at the end of the tournament (2nd to 5th) are also eligible to play the Cup.

For the Copa Sudamericana, six teams are eligible. Clubs placed 6th to 11th in the table at the end of the tournament, gain a place to play the cup.

History

Round-robin tournaments (1891–1966)

In 1891 the Association Argentine Football League was established, with Alex Lamont of St. Andrew's Scots School as one of its board members. The AAFL was the first football league outside of the British Isles.,  to establish a football league. The first Primera División matches were played on 12 April 1891: Buenos Aires FC vs. St. Andrew's and Old Caledonians vs. Belgrano FC.

A single double round-robin tournament was played each year, and the team with the most points was crowned as champion, except for 1936, during that year the winners of Copa de Honor and the Campeonato played a match for the championship title. The single tournament arrangement lasted until 1966.

During this period, the traditional "Big Five" clubs, namely, River Plate, Boca Juniors, Independiente, Racing and San Lorenzo dominated Argentine football. No other team besides them had won the league championship in these 36 years. The most serious title challenge came from Banfield in 1951, when they gained the same points with Racing Club in the league table. However, they lost 1–0 in the two-legged first place playoffs and gave the title to Racing.

The averaging system for relegations was implemented for the first time in the 1957 championship, with Ferro Carril Oeste becoming the first team to be relegated under that system. Averaging continued until 1963, when the championship returned to its old format (with the worst placed teams being relegated).  Nevertheless, there were no relegations until 1967 (with Unión (SF) and Deportivo Español being sent to Primera B after playing a relegation tournament contested by teams of First and Second divisions to define the promotions and relegations).

Metropolitano and Nacional (1967–1985)

In 1967, the single tournament format was abandoned and replaced by two championships in each year: the Metropolitano and the Nacional. The Metropolitano only allowed clubs competing the old tournament to participate, while the Nacional was open to teams from regional tournaments. The format of competition was also altered, with the double round-robin tournament replaced by the two-group championship Metropolitano and single round-robin Nacional in that year.

This change brought about a revolution in Argentine football, as small teams, like Estudiantes de La Plata at first, and Vélez Sarsfield, Chacarita Juniors and others in later years, broke down the hegemony of the five clubs who had won all the championships up to that date.

Between 1967 and 1969, the Metropolitano and Nacional had gone through several format changes. In the first three years, the Metropolitano was a two-group championship, with the best two teams from each group competing the semi-finals of the knock-out stage.

The six best teams of each group would advance to the Nacional, with four more teams coming from regional tournaments, to compete for the Nacional championship in a single round-robin format. The seventh and eighth team of each group, alongside four teams from regional tournaments, played the Promocional tournament, which, in 1969, was replaced by the Petit tournament contested without regional teams. The ninth to twelfth teams of each group entered the Reclasificatorio tournament to determine the relegating teams.

In 1970, the format of the Metropolitano and Nacional underwent a reform. Since that year, and until 1985, the Nacional had become a group tournament with playoffs, while the Metropolitano had been competed under a single or double round-robin system, except for the 1974, 1976 and 1979 edition, which were also contested as a group tournament with playoffs.

Despite the format change in 1970, teams still entered the Nacional championship, Petit tournament and Reclasificatorio tournament according to their rankings in the Metropolitano in that year. However, in 1971, the tournaments were separated. Teams did not enter the Nacional by finishing at the top ranks of Metropolitano. On the other hand, the Petit tournament and Reclasificatorio tournament were abandoned. The Metropolitano and Nacional became two truly individual tournaments. Although the old system was reused in 1972, the separation was instituted again in 1973 and was adopted throughout the remaining Metropolitano and Nacional era.

The Metropolitano was always played first, until the order of the tournaments was reversed in 1982.

After 20 years since the last time it had been used, the average system for relegations returned in the 1983 Metropolitano championship, two years after San Lorenzo was relegated. That year, River Plate finished 18° out of 19 teams and would have been relegated under the old system, along with Racing de Córdoba. The first teams to be relegated on average were Racing and Nueva Chicago. Boca Juniors was also struggling at that time and had a dismal 1984 season. These facts have led to speculation that the averaging system was instituted to minimize the chance of big teams being relegated.

European-styled seasons (1985–1991)
Following the advice of Argentina national football team's then coach Carlos Salvador Bilardo, the structure of play was modified in 1985. Traditionally, like other countries in Southern Hemisphere, football season began and ended according to the calendar year. However, upon the reform, European style season was adopted for the first time among all the South American countries. Moreover, instead of holding two championships every year, only one double round-robin tournament was contested, like football leagues in Europe. The team topping the table at the end of season was crowned the champion.

In 1985, after the Nacional was played, the Metropolitano was not held, while the new single tournament (1985/86) was played for the first time.

In 1988–89 season, three points were given to match winners. If a draw occurred, penalty shootout was taken place and the winner of the shootout would get two points while the loser still had one. This format was waived in the following season.

Apertura and Clausura (1991–2012)

Five years later, the single championship was split into two single-round tournaments, giving birth to the Apertura and Clausura arrangement. In 1991 the two champions played winner-take-all matches. This practice was very controversial, especially since one of the biggest teams, Boca Juniors, lost the finals against Newell's Old Boys, costing them their first official championship since 1981 despite an unbeaten run in the Clausura. In 1992 the game was held as well (this time between Newell's Old Boys and River Plate), but regardless of the result (which favored River Plate) both teams were awarded the title of Champion. After 1992, the practice was quickly abandoned, so that two champions (on equal footing) were crowned every season and no deciding game is played.

Originally, two points were given to match winners except in the 1989–90 season. Starting in 1995–96, the rule was changed and three points were given for a win, one for a draw and none for a loss.

The 1999–2000 season introduced the promotion and relegation system for the first time, where the two clubs placed 1st and 2nd within the four teams with the lowest average, had to play a two-leg series with teams from Primera B Nacional to keep their place in the division.

Inicial and Final (2012–2014)
For the 2012–13 season, the Torneo Apertura and Clausura became "Torneo Inicial" and "Torneo Final," being disputed with the same format as before but proclaiming only one champion each season, unlike the last format that had two champions (Apertura and Clausura, respectively).

Before those changes, a controversial project for the 2012–13 season had been proposed: it consisted in a new tournament that would contain both the Primera División and Primera B Nacional teams: the former was not going to have any relegated team in its 2011–12 season and include sixteen teams from the latter, Primera B Nacional. The tournament would also include a team from the Primera B Metropolitana and one from the Torneo Argentino A, creating a 38-team league. These changes were strongly opposed by the media and the people, and finally the tournament was called off. However, the project for the new format was successfully picked up starting from the 2015 season.

Superfinal (2013–2014) 

Once Inicial and Final tournaments have finished, both winners had to play a match for the Copa Campeonato (familiarly known as Superfinal). The AFA had previously determined that the first edition (played in 2013) would be considered as a Primera División official title (2012–13 season), therefore Vélez Sarsfield awarded its 10th official championship after defeating Newell's.

Nevertheless, from the 2014 edition it was determined that the Superfinal would not be considered as a Primera División title but an official cup.

Due to this the 2015 and 2016 seasons were played as single tournaments with only one champion per season, the Copa Campeonato has not been held since then.

2014–20: One tournament again and Superliga 
Starting August 2014, the "Torneo de Transición" was held, with 20 teams participating (17 from the 2013–14 season and 3 promoted from the 2013–14 Primera B Nacional). No teams were relegated at the end of the championship.

In 2015, the format switched to a tournament with 30 teams. The first five clubs of the Zonas A & B of 2014 Primera B Nacional season promoted to the Primera División. Those 10 teams, with the addition of the 20 clubs currently participating in the top division, qualified to contest the next season.

That same year, the AFA announced the format for the next five seasons of the Primera División:

 In the first half of 2016, the league was contested by 30 teams. One team was relegated to and one team was promoted from Primera B Nacional.
 From August 2016 to June 2017, the league was also contested by 30 teams. Four teams were relegated to and two teams were promoted from Primera B Nacional.
 From August 2017 to June 2018, the league was contested by 28 teams. Four teams will be relegated to and two teams will be promoted from Primera B Nacional. This season was also the first "Superliga Argentina", organised by the homonymous entity, that is administrated independently and has its own statute. Therefore, the AFA focused exclusively in the Argentina national teams. The 2017–18 season was the first championship organised by the body.
 From August 2018 to June 2019, the Superliga was contested by 26 teams. Four teams were relegated to and two teams were promoted from Primera B Nacional.

2020–present 
In February 2020, President of AFA Claudio Tapia stated that the Superliga had been established to position Argentine football as a product, but it failed in that purpose. As a result, AFA would take over the organisation of Primera División championships, according with Tapia's statement. One month after those announcements, the president of the Superliga, Mariano Elizondo, resigned.

The Superliga was replaced by a similar body, named "Liga Profesional de Fútbol", directly linked to AFA and presided by Marcelo Tinelli. It was expected that Superliga was dissolved once the 2020 edition of Copa de la Superliga Argentina finished, but due to COVID-19 pandemic the cup was cancelled, accelerating times. In May 2020, the LFP was launched by the AFA.

Clubs 

As of 2023, Twenty-eight teams are competing in the league, the 26 teams that took part in the previous season as well as two promoted teams from the 2022 Primera Nacional. Boca Juniors are the defending champions.

Champions 

Since the first championship held in 1891, 28 different clubs have won the Primera División title at least once. The most successful club is River Plate, with 37 titles. Other successful clubs are Boca Juniors with 35, Racing with 18, Independiente with 16, and San Lorenzo with 15.

Top scorers 

The all-time top scorer of Primera División Argentina is Paraguayan forward Arsenio Erico with 295 goals. Most players on the all-time top scorers table had their golden age before the 1970s, with all of the top five all-time scorers having retired before 1973. The only player retired after that year in the top twenty list is Martín Palermo, who played for Estudiantes (LP) and Boca Juniors in Primera División.

Records and facts

Media coverage 

In Argentina, matches are broadcast by American companies ESPN and Turner, which signed a contract for 5 years where both companies agreed to pay A$ 3,200 million per year. Local company Torneos, who was formerly the official broadcaster of the Argentine championship from 1985 until 2009, will take over the content production of the games for Fox and La Corte will handle content production for Turner while Cablevisión, DirecTV and Telecentro will be the TV operators.

Until the agreement with Fox and Turner was signed, Argentine football matches were broadcast nationally by El Trece, Telefe, America TV, and Channel 7. Games were free in Argentina from 2009 to 2016 thanks to the "Fútbol para Todos" (Football for Everyone) program, when the National Government and AFA decided rescind the agreement. The Government paid A$9,500 million for 7 years.

The league attracts television audiences beyond South America, Europe, Africa and MENA. The matches are broadcast in over 80 countries. In Latin America the matches are broadcast live by ESPN (three matches per week), TyC Sports International (all the matches per week) and another streaming platforms like Prende TV, Star+ and Fanatiz (together with AFA Play). In the United States, the matches are streamed on Paramount+ since 2021. BeIN Sports broadcasts the games live in France and MENA regions. ITV showed highlights on a regional basis with the introduction of overnight broadcasting in 1988–89. Channel 5 showed highlights from 1999 to 2003, while Premier Sports showed live games across 2011 and 2012.

References

External links

 
 Argentine Primera División : stats, team, fixtures, results

 
1891 establishments in Argentina
1
Professional sports leagues in Argentina
Sports leagues established in 1891
Argentina